Tine Rustad Albertsen (née Kristiansen, born 12 February 1980) is a Norwegian handball player, who previously played for Larvik HK.

She made her debut on the Norwegian national team in 2005, and played 43 matches and scored 52 goals. Former club is Fjellhammer IL (Norway). She won the Women's EHF Cup Winners' Cup with the club Larvik HK in 2004/2005, and in 2007/2008.

References

1980 births
Living people
Norwegian female handball players
People from Lørenskog
Sportspeople from Viken (county)